Pilsen may refer to:

Places
Plzeň, Czech Republic, known in German and English as Pilsen
Pilsen Plaza, shopping mall and entertainment center in Plzeň
Pilsen, Chicago, Illinois, U.S.
Pilsen Historic District in the Chicago community area
Pilsen, Kansas, U.S.
Pilsen, Wisconsin, U.S.
Pilsen (community), Wisconsin, U.S.

Sport
FC Viktoria Plzeň, an association football club
HC Plzeň, an ice hockey club

Other uses
Cerveza Pilsen (Paraguay), a pilsner beer brand from Paraguay
Pilsen (band), a punk band from Argentina

See also
Pilsner, type of beer
Pilzno or Pilsen, Poland
Nagybörzsöny or Deutsch Pilsen, Hungary